Andrzej Stanisław Kostka Młodziejowski (1717–1780), of Ślepowron coat of arms, was a Polish–Lithuanian nobleman, politician and priest. Bishop of Przemyśl (1766–1768), bishop of Poznań (1768–1780), Deputy Chancellor of the Crown (1746–1767), Great Chancellor of the Crown (1767–1780).

He was one of the Polish nobles and politicians in service to the Russian embassy, from whom he received financial support. Supported their demands, including the First Partition of Poland. Accused of corruption, immorality and even of involvement with the murder of primate of Poland Władysław Aleksander Łubieński.

See also
 Młodziejowski Palace in Warsaw

Ecclesiastical senators of the Polish–Lithuanian Commonwealth
1726 births
1794 deaths
Roman Catholic bishops of Przemyśl
Bishops of Poznań
18th-century Roman Catholic bishops in the Polish–Lithuanian Commonwealth
18th-century Polish nobility
Clan of Ślepowron
Crown Vice-Chancellors